Peter Stone (born 5 May 1938) is a New Zealand cricketer. He played in twenty-three first-class matches for Northern Districts from 1961 to 1969.

See also
 List of Northern Districts representative cricketers

References

External links
 

1938 births
Living people
New Zealand cricketers
Northern Districts cricketers
People from Kaitaia